Rohingya people in Pakistan are a community based in Karachi, Sindh, Pakistan. They are Rohingya Muslims, an ethnic group native to Rakhine State, Myanmar (also known as Arakan, Burma), who have fled their homeland because of the persecution of Muslims by the Burmese government and Buddhist majority. According to varied Pakistani government sources and the Arakan Historical Society, there are some 200,000 Rohingya refugees residing in Pakistan. All of them have made a perilous journey across Bangladesh and India and have settled in Karachi. A report on human trafficking stated that Burmese people make up fourteen percent of Karachi's undocumented immigrants. Large scale Rohingya migration to Karachi made Karachi one of the largest population centres of Rohingyas in the world after Myanmar. In the recent years, scores of Burmese women seeking employment have entered the country. Different resources cite the number of these women to be in the thousands.

Rohingyas and Bengalis in Karachi 
According to community leaders and social scientists, there are over 1.6 million Bengalis and up to 400,000 Rohingyas living in Karachi. There are numerous Burmese housing colonies that can be found throughout Karachi. Traditionally, cultural similarities of the Rohingya people to those of Bengalis has enabled easier communication and interaction of the Burmese in Karachi with the Bengali community. Their native Rohingya language furthermore has dialect familiarities especially with the Bangladeshi natives hailing from Chittagong, who speak a somewhat indistinct Chittagonian language. As a result of the great inter-ethnic engagement, the Burmese people in Pakistan have a special reputation for being found in areas only that traditionally also contain a Bengali population.  With more stringent control and difficulty in traversing borders the Burmese have now started travelling east to countries closer to Myanmar such as Thailand, Cambodia, Bangladesh, Vietnam and Malaysia. The number of Rohingya Burmese in Pakistan has been on the decline in recent years.

Notable people 
 Ataullah abu Ammar Jununi - Founder and leader of Arakan Rohingya Salvation Army (ARSA)
 Ashraf Tai — pioneer of Bando karate in Pakistan.

See also 
 Burmee Colony, a Rohingya-majority neighbourhood in Karachi
 Pakistanis in Myanmar
 Bengalis in Pakistan

References

External links 
 The Rohingya in Pakistan - Refugee Resettlement Watch (Wordpress)
 ‘Govt has not done enough for us since our arrival in Pakistan’
 Invisible Pakistanis: Neither here nor there
 
 Rohingya Muslims who fled Burma decades ago did not escape persecution
 The Rohingyas of Karachi
 Pakistan Muslim Alliance starts reaching out to Bengali and Rohingya communities
 Fishermen of Burmese origin maintain their identity
 Identity issue haunts Karachi’s Rohingya population
 Far From Myanmar Violence, Rohingya in Pakistan Are Seething
 Rohingyas of Karachi struggle to deal with identity crisis
 ‘All we can do now is pray’: Rohingya families in India, Pakistan despair as Myanmar crisis unfolds
 Pakistan is fuelling unrest in Myanmar’s backyard
 The Rohingya of Pakistan

 
Ethnic groups in Pakistan
Pakistan
Immigration to Pakistan
Muhajir communities
Refugees in Pakistan
Pakistan